George William Beaumont Howard, 13th Earl of Carlisle (born 15 February 1949), styled Viscount Morpeth from 1963 to 1994, is a British nobleman, politician, and hereditary peer. 

In 1994, on the death of his father, he inherited three English peerages, Earl of Carlisle, Viscount Howard of Morpeth, and Baron Dacre of Gillesland, and a fourth, Lord Ruthven of Freeland, in the Peerage of Scotland.  He was a member of the House of Lords from 1994 to 1999.

Life
Educated at Eton College and Balliol College, Oxford, Carlisle is the son of Charles Howard, 12th Earl of Carlisle.

A member of the Howard family and a kinsman of the Duke of Norfolk, he is also a co-heir to the baronies of Greystock and Clifford.

He was commissioned as an officer into the 9th/12th Royal Lancers regiment of the British Army, retiring with the rank of Major.

As Viscount Morpeth, he unsuccessfully contested Easington in the 1987 general election and Leeds West in the 1992 general election as well as Northumbria in the 1989 European elections for the Liberal Democrats.

Having lost his automatic right to a seat in the House of Lords under the House of Lords Act 1999, Carlisle has stood as a Liberal Democrat in By elections to the House of Lords; his best performance was finishing a distant second to Labour's Viscount Hanworth in the 2011 by-election to replace Lord Strabolgi.

Carlisle is an academic and commentator on Baltic States matters, having lived for some time in Tartu, Estonia. The President of Estonia has appointed him a Knight 1st Class of the Order of the Cross of Terra Mariana. He played a role in securing memorial plaques to the 112 British servicemen killed in the 1919 operation which ensured the independence of the Baltic States. These plaques have been set up in numerous places, notably at Portsmouth Cathedral by the then First Sea Lord, Admiral Lord West of Spithead in 2005, and by HM The Queen during her visit to Tallinn in 2010.

The heir presumptive to the earldom and other peerages is the 13th Earl's brother, The Hon Philip Charles Wentworth Howard.

Arms

Decorations
  Knight 1st Class, Order of the Cross of Terra Mariana

See also
Castle Howard

References

External links
Who's Who
Debrett's People of Today

1949 births
Living people
People educated at Eton College
Alumni of Balliol College, Oxford
9th/12th Royal Lancers officers
George Howard, 13th Earl of Carlisle
13
13
Recipients of the Order of the Cross of Terra Mariana, 1st Class
Liberal Democrats (UK) hereditary peers
Carlisle